SGCD may refer to:
 Delta-sarcoglycan, a protein
 2-Amino-4-deoxychorismate synthase, an enzyme